This is a list of South Korean films that received a domestic theatrical release in 2013.

Box office
The highest-grossing South Korean films released in 2013, by domestic box office gross revenue, are as follows:

Released

See also
 2013 in South Korea
 2013 in South Korean music

References

External links
2013 in South Korea

List of 2013 box office number-one films in South Korea

2013
Box
South Korean